Qasr-e Cham (also Romanized as Qaşr-e Cham; also known as ‘Aşr-e Shām, Asricham, and Qaşr-e Jam) is a village in Manzariyeh Rural District, in the Central District of Shahreza County, Isfahan Province, Iran. At the 2006 census, its population was 1,716, in 408 families.

References 

Populated places in Shahreza County